Balkrishna may refer to:

 Balkrishna (born 1972), Indian billionaire.
 Balkrishna Industries Indian tire manufacturing company.
 Balkrishna Vithaldas Doshi (born 1927), Indian architect.